Asbury Township is one of ten townships in Gallatin County, Illinois, USA.  As of the 2010 census, its population was 105 and it contained 51 housing units.

Geography

Unincorporated towns
 Cottonwood at 
(This list is based on USGS data and may include former settlements.)

Cemeteries
The township contains these two cemeteries: Cottonwood Presbyterian Church and Swan.

Demographics

School districts
 Gallatin Community Unit School District 7

Political districts
 Illinois' 15th congressional district
 State House District 118
 State Senate District 59

References
 
 United States Census Bureau 2007 TIGER/Line Shapefiles
 United States National Atlas

External links
 City-Data.com
 Illinois State Archives

Townships in Gallatin County, Illinois
Townships in Illinois